Anna Mastro is an American film director, music video director and television producer.

A native of Seattle, Washington, Mastro graduated from the University of Washington at the age of nineteen. She became a protege to director McG, working as his assistant on the Wonderland Sound and Vision productions Fastlane, Charlie's Angels: Full Throttle and The O.C..

As a television producer, she worked on the reality series Pussycat Dolls Present.

As a music video director, she directed videos for the artists Train, Leona Lewis, Alex Band, Carbon Leaf, Kristen Kelly, Victoria Justice and The Pussycat Dolls. In 2008, she directed the short film Matter starring Amanda Righetti. In 2011, she directed the short film Bench Seat starring Cassie Scerbo and written by Neil LaBute. The film earned a Short Grand Prix nomination at the Warsaw International Film Festival.

In 2012, she directed the Gossip Girl episode "Save the Last Chance", one of the final four episodes of the series.

References

External links

American film directors
American music video directors
American television producers
American women television producers
American women film directors
Female music video directors
Living people
Filmmakers from Seattle
University of Washington alumni
Year of birth missing (living people)
21st-century American women